Kathy Alexis Psomiades is an American literary critic and an associate professor of English at Duke University.

Education 
Psomiades graduated from Bryn Mawr College and received her M.A. and M.Phil. from Yale University before earning her Ph.D. at Yale.

Career 
Psomiades taught at the University of Notre Dame before joining Duke's faculty in 2003. Her first book, Beauty's Body: Femininity and Representation in British Aestheticism (Stanford University Press, 1997), examines the work done in 19th-century aesthetic poetry by a certain culturally pervasive image of embodied beauty. By "reversing the usual order of priority given to the institution of art and its figures," Beauty's Body suggests "that a certain figure of femininity is not merely the content of Aestheticist works, not merely a way in which artists can represent their own marginalized status in the culture, but rather the linchpin of the symbolic system through which Aestheticism thinks itself." In 1999, she co-edited with Talia Schaffer an influential collection of essays called Women and British Representation (University of Virginia Press, 1999), which worked to carve out a space for femininity in both 19th-century artistic production and contemporary literary criticism. Her current project, provisionally titled Primitive Marriage: Victorian Anthropology and the Novel, aims to make an intervention in the way critics read the marriage plot and courtship rituals in Victorian novels by reading 19th-century fiction alongside contemporaneous anthropological and Darwinian accounts of mating and reproduction.

Her essays have appeared in Novel: A Forum on Fiction, Victorian Poetry, Victorian Review, The Oxford Encyclopedia of British Literature (2006, ed. David Scott Kastan and Nancy Armstrong), Criticism, Victorian Studies, Nineteenth-Century Literature, and Modernism/Modernity, in addition to numerous essay collections. In recent years she has also served as the director of graduate studies in Duke's English department. Along with Michael Valdez Moses and Michael Gillespie she convened Duke's Political Theory Working Group. She received an NEH Fellowship and the Kaneb Award on for undergraduate teaching at Notre Dame.

References 

Living people
American literary critics
Women literary critics
Bryn Mawr College alumni
Duke University faculty
Yale University alumni
Year of birth missing (living people)
American women critics